Guy-Roland Niangbo Nassa (born 21 May 1986) is a Ivorian professional footballer who plays as a left winger for Belgian club ASE Chastre.

Career
Niangbo began his career in 2001 with Toumodi FC and moved to the Belgium club Charleroi-Marchienne in July 2005. There, he scored 12 goals in 33 games. He moved to Bastia in July 2008. In January 2011, he joined Tubize in the Belgian Second Division on loan.

Ahead of the 2019–20 season, Niangbo joined Belgian club RUS Rebecq.

References

External links
 
 
 Guy-Roland Niangbo Nassa foot-national.com Profile

1986 births
Living people
Footballers from Abidjan
Association football wingers
Ivorian footballers
Ivorian expatriate footballers
SC Bastia players
R. Olympic Charleroi Châtelet Farciennes players
Toumodi FC players
Luzenac AP players
FC Istres players
US Boulogne players
Athlético Marseille players
FC Martigues players
R.U.S. Rebecquoise players
Ligue 2 players
Championnat National players
Expatriate footballers in France
Ivorian expatriate sportspeople in France
Expatriate footballers in Belgium